Once You're Lucky, Twice You're Good is a book written by Sarah Lacy and published in 2008. It is about some of the most successful companies of Silicon Valley and an in-depth insight into the story behind the founders, including anecdotes and other stories.

External links
 Book review by Wired magazine
 Interview with Sarah Lacy
 Book reviews from readers at Goodreads
 Sarah Lacy’s Hot Book-Signing Party covered by Wired magazine

2008 non-fiction books